Galt or GALT may refer to:

Biology and biochemistry
 Galactose-1-phosphate uridylyltransferase, an enzyme
 Gut-associated lymphoid tissue, a subset of mucosa-associated lymphoid tissue

People and fictional characters
 Galt (surname), a list of people and fictional characters
 Christopher Galt, a pseudonym of Craig Russell (British author)
 Walter Galt, a pen name of Talbot Mundy, born William Lancaster Gribbon (1879–1940)
 Galt MacDermot (1928–2018), Canadian-American composer, pianist and writer of musical theatre

Places

United States
 Galt, California, a city
 Galt Island (Florida)
 Galt, Illinois, an unincorporated community
 Galt, Iowa, a city
 Galt, Kansas, an unincorporated community
 Galt, Michigan, a settlement
 Galt, Missouri, a city

Elsewhere
 Galt, Ontario, Canada, now part of Cambridge
 Galt Historic Railway Park, Alberta, Canada
 Galt, Khövsgöl, Mongolia, a sum (district)

Other uses
 HMCS Galt (K163), a Royal Canadian Navy corvette
 Galt Toys, a British toy and game manufacturer
 Galt High School, Galt, California
 Galt Museum & Archives, Lethbridge, Alberta, Canada

See also
 Gault (disambiguation)